Rasos Cemetery is the oldest and most famous cemetery in the city of Vilnius, Lithuania. It is named after the Rasos district where it is located. It is separated into two parts, the old and the new cemeteries, by a narrow Sukilėliai Street. The total area is 10.8 ha. Since 1990 new burials are allowed only to family graves.

History
The year 1769 is cited in many sources as the date when the cemetery was founded. However, some historians believe it is a typo and the real date should be 1796. On April 24, 1801, the new cemetery was consecrated. Two days later Jan Müller, the mayor of Vilnius, became the first person to be buried there. A formal document was signed in July 1801. It specified that the cemetery received  of land and that the cemetery will be free of charge to all city residents. It was the first cemetery in Vilnius not located next to a church.

In 1802–1807 two columbariums were built. They reached up to five stories in height and were joined at a right angle. At the end of the 19th century the columbariums began deteriorating. In between the columbariums, a neo-gothic red brick chapel was built in 1844–50. In 1888 a matching belltower was added to the chapel. At first the cemetery was surrounded by a wooden fence, but it burned down in 1812. A brick fence was rebuilt in 1820 and portions of it survive to this day.

In 1814 the cemetery was expanded as authorities bought additional land from a city resident. The addition is now known as the Hill of the Literati (Lithuanian: Literatų kalnelis). In 1847, members of the Eastern Orthodox church opened their own cemetery next to Rasos. It was used to bury soldiers from a nearby monastery hospital and poor city residents. Therefore, it became known as the Cemetery of Orphans (Lithuanian: Našlaičių kapinės).

After World War II, the Soviet authorities demolished the right columbarium and in the 1970s razed the left columbarium. The whole necropolis was to be destroyed in the 1980s as the Soviet authorities planned a major motorway to be built directly through the cemetery. Due to a press campaign led by the Polish-language   (Red Banner) newspaper and economic difficulties, the destruction was halted. After Lithuanian independence (1990) and the collapse of the Soviet Union (1991), Lithuanian and Polish authorities collaborated in a restoration of the cemetery.

Polish war cemetery
In 1920 a war cemetery was built near the entrance for 164 Polish soldiers who fell in the city during the Polish–Soviet War and Polish–Lithuanian War. It was rebuilt in 1935–1936 by Wojciech Jastrzębowski, who also designed the tombstone where the heart of Józef Piłsudski is enshrined.

Until September 18, 1939, when the Red Army entered the city, an honorary guard of three soldiers stood there at all times. Three unknown soldiers who refused to give up their arms to the Soviets in 1939 were shot on the spot and are now buried next to Marshal Piłsudski's heart. Part of the cemetery contains graves of Polish Home Army soldiers, who fell during the Wilno Uprising. Their graves, demolished after World War II, were rebuilt by the funds of the Republic of Poland in 1993.

Notable interments 

There are many famous Lithuanians, Poles, and Belarusians buried there, including over fifty Vilnius University professors. Those interred there include:
 Vladas Abramavičius (1909–1965), Lithuanian cultural historian, poet, journalist, translator
 Adam Ferdynand Adamowicz (1802–1881), one of the pioneers of Polish veterinary, president of the Medical Society of Vilna
 Francišak Alachnovič (1883–1944), Belarusian writer, journalist
 Jonas Ambrozaitis (1856–1916), Lithuanian cultural figure, organizer of secret plays of then banned Lithuanian theater, Lithuanian book smuggler and distributor
 Juozapas Ambraziejus–Ambrozevičius (1855–1915), Lithuanian composer, poet, establisher of Lithuanian orchestra in Šnipiškės Saint Raphael church in 1897, member of the secret Lithuanian patriotic organization of Vilnius "Dvylika Vilniaus apaštalų" ("Twelve Apostles of Vilnius") (1895–1904)
 Andrius Ašmantas (1906–1941), Lithuanian linguist, scholar, Lithuanian cultural activist of Lithuania Minor
 Bolesław Bałzukiewicz (1867–1915), Polish sculptor, professor at the Vilnius University
 Jonas Basanavičius (1851–1927), Lithuanian physician, scientist, patriot, activist, editor of Lithuanian newspaper Aušra, signer of the Act of Independence of Lithuania
 August Bécu (1771–1824), physician, stepfather Juliusz Słowacki
 Cenotaph to Kazys Bizauskas, (1893–1941) Lithuanian statesman, diplomat, author, one of the twenty signatories of the Act of Independence of Lithuania
 Kazys Boruta (1905–1965), Lithuanian writer and poet
 Janina Burchardówna (1883–1924), Polish journalist, teacher
 Mikalojus Konstantinas Čiurlionis (1875–1911), Lithuanian painter, photographer and composer
 Petras Cvirka (1909–1947), Lithuanian writer
 Kristupas Čibiras (1888–1942), Lithuanian priest, cultural figure, political activist, active member of Lithuanian cultural and educational organization Lietuvių švietimo draugija "Rytas"
 Aleksander Dalewski (1827–1862), Polish political activist, founder of "Związek Bratni"
 Viktoras Dasys (1895–1944), Lithuanian cultural activist
 Rimantas Daugintis (1944–1990), famous Lithuanian sculptor; committed suicide by self-immolation protesting Soviet regime in Lithuania
 Borisas Dauguvietis (1885–1949), Lithuanian playwright, actor
 Mečislovas Davainis–Silvestraitis (1849–1919), Lithuanian journalist, poet, specialist in Lithuanian folklore, book smuggler, Lithuanian cultural activist
 Cenotaph to Pranas Dovydaitis (1886–1942), Lithuanian politician, teacher, encyclopedist, editor, professor, Signatory of the Act of Independence of Lithuania, Prime Minister of Lithuania
 Wacław Dziewulski (1882–1938), Polish physician, professor at Vilnius University
 Antonina Fiszer (1824–1840), Polish actress
 Liudas Gira (1884–1946), Lithuanian poet, writer, and literary critic
 Antoni Józef Gliński (1818–1865), Polish writer
 Antanas Gudaitis (1904–1989), Lithuanian painter
 Laurynas Gucevičius (1753–1798), Lithuanian architect
 Władysław Horodyjski, Polish philosopher, professor at Vilnius University
 Czesław Jankowski (1857–1929), Polish poet
 Ludwik Janowski (1878–1921), Polish cultural historian, professor
 Rapolas Jakimavičius (1893–1961), Lithuanian painter and sculptor
 Stasys Jasilionis (1892–1950), Lithuanian American poet, writer, cultural figure
 Wacław Jasiński (1881–1936), Polish pediatrician, professor at the University of Vilnius
 Jonas Jašmantas (1849–1906), Lithuanian cultural figure, founder of the Lithuanian and Samogitian Charitable Society in Saint Petersburg, member of the secret Lithuanian patriotic organization of Vilnius "Dvylika Vilniaus apaštalų"
 Adam Jocher (1791–1860), Polish librarian, founder of the first public library in Vilnius
 Aleksandras Jurašaitis (1859–1915), Lithuanian photographer, one of the first Lithuanian filmmakers, founder of his own photographic studio ("Jurašaičio ateljė") on Gediminas Avenue of Vilnius (1902–1922), Lithuanian cultural activist
 Konstanty Kalinowski (1823–1864), Belarusian military commander of insurgents during the January Uprising
 Aldona Didžiulytė–Kazanavičienė (1892–1968), Lithuanian children's literature writer
 Vincas Kisarauskas (1934–1988), Lithuanian painter, graphic artist, scenographer. One of initiators of ex-librīs movement, one of the first Lithuanian artists, who popularized Collage, Assemblage, Photomontage techniques
 Franciszka Kleczkowska (1827–1889), Polish educational activist
 Juliusz Kłos (1881–1933), Polish architect, author of the guidebook to Vilnius
 Felicjan Kochanowski (1831–1887), Polish priest, educational activist
 Kazys Kriščiukaitis (1870–1949), famous Lithuanian wood sculptor, author of wooden altars, restorer, establisher of his own workshop in Vilnius (1890)
 Kazimiera Kymantaitė (1909–1999), Lithuanian film and actress and stage director
 Jonas Kruopas (1908–1975), Lithuanian linguist, scholar
 Marcelė Kubiliūtė, the only Lithuanian woman awarded all major Lithuanian orders
 Antanas Kučas (1909–1989), Lithuanian graphic artist, book illustrator, professor
 Gabrielius Landsbergis–Žemkalnis (1852–1916), Lithuanian playwright, publicist, book distributor, administrator of Vilniaus žinios
 Sigitas Benjaminas Lasavickas (1925–1998), Lithuanian architect and theorist, architectural restorer, who contributed greatly to conservation and restoration of Vilnius castles, Trakai castles, Medininkai Castle
 Anton Lavicki aka Jadvihin Š. (1869–1922), Belarusian playwright, opinion journalist, specialist in literature, translator and poet
 Joachim Lelewel (1786–1861), Polish historian, professor at Vilnius University
 Cenotaph to Anton Luckievich (1884–1942), Belarusian politician, historian, cultural figure, head of Belarusian museum in Vilnius
 Ivan Luckievič (1881–1919), Belarusian cultural figure, bibliophile, collectionner, historian, archaeologist, whose collection was a base for Belarusian museum in Vilnius (established in 1921)
 Józef Łukaszewicz (1863–1928), Polish professor at Stefan Batory University and revolutionist
 Wacław Leon Makowski (1854–1929), Polish publisher
 Mikołaj Malinowski (1799–1865), Polish-Lithuanian historian, archaeologist
 Jonas Marcinkevičius (1900–1953), Lithuanian writer, journalist
 Alfonsas Mikulskis (1909–1983), Lithuanian composer, musical conductor, choirmaster of Lithuanian National Art Ensemble "Čiurlionis" in Cleveland
 Ona Mikulskienė (1905–2008), cultural figure of Lithuanian Americans, conductor of kanklės ensembles
 Cenotaph to Vladas Mironas (1880–1953), Lithuanian priest, cultural figure, politician, member of the Council of Lithuania, Signatory of the Act of Independence of Lithuania, Prime Minister of Lithuania.
 Józef Montwiłł (1850–1911), Polish humanist and sponsor of hospitals, orphanages and museums, sponsor of separate suburbs of houses in Vilnius (so-called colonies, most notable Lukiškės/Montvila colony near Lukiškės Square)
 Povilas Pakarklis (1902–1955), Lithuanian historian, professor of Vilnius University
 Augustinas Paškevičius (1844–1914), Lithuanian doctor, cultural figure, chairman (1909–14) of Lithuanian cultural Rūta Society of Vilnius
 Vincas Mykolaitis–Putinas (1893–1967), Lithuanian writer
 Jan O'Connor (1760–1802), physician, professor at Vilnius University
 Jerzy Orda (1905–1972), Polish historian, social activist
 Elena Žalinkevičaitė-Petrauskienė (1900–1986), famous Lithuanian actor, poet, playwright
 Kipras Petrauskas (1885–1968), famous Lithuanian tenor, founder of Lithuanian opera
 Mikas Petrauskas (1873–1937), Lithuanian composer, musical conductor, cultural figure, author of the first Lithuanian opera Birutė (staged in the building of the then City Hall, that is currently Lithuanian National Philharmonic in 1906)
 The heart of Józef Piłsudski (1867–1935), Polish statesman. Also his mother, two brothers, and first wife are buried at Rasos cemetery
 Onufry Pietraszkiewicz (1793–1863), Polish poet
 Maria Piłsudska (née Koplewska; 1865–1921), first wife of Józef Piłsudski
 Adam Piłsudski (1869–1935), Polish politician, vice-president of Vilna, brother of Józef Piłsudski
 Stasys Pinkus (1925–1992), Lithuanian art historian
 Karol Podczaszyński (1790–1860), Polish-Lithuanian architect, professor at Vilnius University
 Rafał Radziwiłłowicz (1860–1929) Polish psychiatrist, social activist, professor at the University of Stefan Batory, co-founder of the Society for Social Medicine, co-founder of the Polish Psychiatric Association (1920)
 Albinas Rimka (1886–1944), Lithuanian economist, publicist, journalist, politician, Finance minister (1926) of Interwar Lithuania, Kaunas and Vilnius university professor
 Ksaveras Sakalauskas–Vanagėlis (1863–1938), Lithuanian book distributor, poet, writer, contributor to Lithuanian newspaper Aušra, organizer of Lithuanian choruses and secret Lithuanian theater plays, chairman of Lithuanian culture society of Warsaw (1923–1934), cultural figure
 Zygmunt Sierakowski (1826–1863), a commander of the January Uprising
 Ludwik Sokołowski (1882–1936), Polish engineer, architect, professor at the University of Stefan Batory
 Marek Konrad Sokołowski (1818–1883), famous Polish, Ukrainian and Russian guitarist, composer, inventor of his own type of Harp guitar, generally known as "The king of guitarists", was awarded the diploma of "The first guitarist of Europe" in 1858 in Carltheater, Vienna, the first professional guitarist of Lithuania
 Euzebiusz Słowacki (1772–1814), Polish theorist and literary historian, father of Juliusz Słowacki
 Franciszek Smuglewicz (1745–1807), Polish-Lithuanian painter, professor at Vilnius University
 Balys Sruoga (1896–1947), Lithuanian writer and concentration camp survivor
 Povilas Snarskis (1889–1969), Lithuanian botanist, florist, professor of Vilnius University, author of books on Lithuanian flora
 Jędrzej Śniadecki (1768–1838), Polish physician, chemist, biologist, writer
 Wiktor Staniewicz (1866–1932), Polish mathematician, professor and rector of the Stefan Batory University in the years 1921–22
 Albin Stepovič (1894–1934), Belarusian writer, composer, musicologist, cultural figure
 Kanstancin Stepovič (Kazimir Svajak) (1890–1926), Belarusian priest, poet, musician, cultural activist
 Konstantinas Stašys (1843–1919), Lithuanian priest, cultural activist
 Władysław Syrokomla (1823–1862), Polish-Lithuanian writer
 Władysław Szachno (1838/40–1889), pianist, composer
 Marcelinas Šikšnys (1874–1970), Lithuanian mathematician, poet, writer, translator, playwright, participant in the banned press, author of the first legal Lithuanian theater performance "Pilėnų kunigaikštis" ("The Duke of Pilėnai") in the Town Hall of Vilnius (1906)
 Jurgis Šlapelis (1876–1941), Lithuanian linguist, translator, founder of the first Lithuanian bookstore in Vilnius, cultural and political figure
 Marija Šlapelienė (1880–1977), cultural figure, actor, active member of Lithuanian "Vilniaus aušra" society, cultural Rūta Society, founder of the first bookstore ("Marijos ir Jurgio Šlapelių lietuvių knygynas"), dedicated to Lithuanian language and literature in Vilnius (1906–1949)
 Juozas Tallat-Kelpša (1889–1949), Lithuanian composer
 Arūnas Tarabilda (1934–1969), Lithuanian graphic artist
 Juozas Tysliava (1902–1961), Lithuanian poet, translator, journalist, publisher
 Valerija Vaivadaitė-Tysliavienė (1914–1984), Lithuanian American cultural figure
 Count Eustachy Tyszkiewicz (1814–1873), Polish-Lithuanian historian, archaeologist
 Kazimieras Umbražiūnas (1909–1996), Lithuanian journalist, publicist, who wrote mostly about the region of Vilnius
 Raimondas Vabalas (1937–2001), Lithuanian film director
 Jonas Vabalas–Gudaitis (1881–1955), Lithuanian psychologist, professor at Vytautas Magnus University and Vilnius University,  initiator of experimental psychology in Lithuania
 Petras Vaičiūnas (1890–1959), Lithuanian poet, translator, playwright
 Stasė Paulauskaitė-Vaineikienė (1884–1946), Lithuanian book smuggler and distributor, secret teacher (daractor), during Lithuanian press ban, writer, poet, cultural figure
 Jonas Vengris (1877–1935), Lithuanian mountain engineer, Lithuanian cultural activist, sponsor of Lithuanian charity organizations, school and policlinic in Vilnius
 Antanas Vileišis (1856–1919), Lithuanian physician, humanist and sponsor of cultural and charity organizations, Lithuanian schools, newspapers, Lithuanian political activist
 Jonas Vileišis (1872–1942), Lithuanian politician, mayor of Kaunas, signer of the Act of Independence of Lithuania
 Petras Vileišis (1851–1926), engineer, humanist and sponsor of cultural and charity organizations, Lithuanian schools, Vilniaus Žinios and other newspapers, Lithuanian art exhibitions in his Vileišis palace
 Antanas Viskantas (1877–1940), Lithuanian priest, writer, cultural figure, founder of Lithuanian cultural organization "Švento Kazimiero draugija" and "Vilniaus lietuvių meno ir literatūros draugija" ("Lithuanian art and literature organization of Vilnius")
 Povilas Višinskis (1875–1906), book smuggler, writer
 Jan Kazimierz Wilczyński (1806–1885), Polish-Lithuanian physician, collector and publisher
 Antoni Wiwulski (1877–1919), Polish-Lithuanian architect and sculptor
 Stanisław Karol Władyczko (1878–1936), Polish neurologist and psychiatrist, professor at the Institute Psychoneurological in St. Petersburg and the Stefan Batory University
 Tadeusz Wróblewski, (1858–1925) Polish lawyer, bibliophile
 Bronisław Wróblewski (1888–1941), Polish lawyer
 Bronisław Żongołłowicz (1879–1944), Polish Catholic priest, professor at the University of Stefan Batory, member of the Sejm
 Zigmas Žemaitis (1884–1969), Lithuanian mathematician, board member (1909–15) of Lithuanian Scientific Society, chairman of Higher Courses of Study (Aukštieji kursai) in Kaunas (University of Lithuania from 1922), aviation enthusiast, prominent cultural figure

There is also a mass grave of Poles kidnapped in 1919 from Vilnius by the Bolsheviks and shot at Daugavpils.
In the middle of the cemetery, on the so-called Hill of Angels (Angelų kalnelis) there is also cenotaph of an angel, dedicated to unborn babies.

See also 
 Antakalnis Cemetery
 Bernardine Cemetery
 List of cemeteries in Lithuania

References 

In-line

General

External links 

 Tombstones catalogue
 Tourist brochure about the cemetery
 Series of photos of the cemetery
 

Cemeteries in Vilnius
Roman Catholic cemeteries
 
Cemeteries established in the 18th century
1769 establishments in the Russian Empire